Crewkerne is a town and electoral ward in Somerset, England,  southwest of Yeovil and  east of Chard all in the South Somerset district. The civil parish of West Crewkerne includes the hamlets of Coombe, Woolminstone and Henley – and borders the county of Dorset to the south. The town is on the main headwater of the River Parrett, A30 road and West of England Main Line railway, in modern times the slower route between the capital and the southwest peninsula, having been eclipsed by the Taunton route.

The earliest written record of Crewkerne is in the 899 will of Alfred the Great who left it to his youngest son Æthelweard. After the Norman conquest it was held by William the Conqueror and in the Domesday Survey of 1086 was described as a royal manor. Crewkerne Castle was possibly a Norman motte castle. The town grew up in the late mediaeval period around the textile industry, its wealth demonstrated in the fifteenth century Church of St Bartholomew. During the 18th and 19th centuries the main industry was cloth making, including webbing, and sails for the Royal Navy.

Local ecological sites include the Bincombe Beeches Local Nature Reserve and the Millwater biological Site of Special Scientific Interest. Crewkerne railway station is served by South Western Railway. There are local supermarkets and local shops, and some local industry. The town is the birthplace of several notable people and has varied cultural and sporting facilities including those at Wadham Community School.

History

The name Crewkerne is thought to be derived from Cruc-aera; from the British cruc - a spur of a hill, and the Old English aera - a house, especially a storehouse. The town was known as Crocern, or Cruaern in the 899 will of Alfred the Great when he left it to his younger son Æthelweard, and by 1066 the manor was held by Edith Swanneck mistress of King Harold. After the Norman conquest the Domesday Survey of 1086 shows the so-named manor was feudally royal, a possession of William the Conqueror, and the church estate was given to the Abbaye-aux-Hommes in Caen, Normandy.

In 1499, John de Combe, a precentor of Exeter Cathedral and former vicar of Crewkerne, founded Crewkerne Grammar School. The school survived until 1904.

The parish was part of the hundred of Crewkerne.

Crewkerne Castle was possibly a Norman motte castle on a mound to the north-west of the town, which is known as Castle Hill. The town grew up in the late mediaeval period around the textile industry, its wealth preserved in its fifteenth century parish church. It later prospered as a coaching stop in the Georgian period.

The Manor Farmhouse in Henley was built from hamstone in the early 17th century, but possibly incorporates medieval fragments. The building is designated by English Heritage as a Grade II* listed building. During the 18th and 19th centuries the main industry was cloth making, including webbing, and sails for the Royal Navy.

Governance

The town council takes charge of some local issues so sets an annual precept (local rate) to cover its costs and makes annual accounts for public scrutiny. It evaluates local planning applications; it works with the police, district council officers, and neighbourhood watch groups on matters of crime, security, and traffic. The parish council's role also includes initiating projects for the maintenance and repair of parish facilities, as well as consulting with the district council on the maintenance, repair, and improvement of highways, drainage, footpaths, public transport, and street cleaning. Conservation matters (including trees and listed buildings) and environmental issues are also the responsibility of the council. The current council, elected on 5 May 2022, consists of eight Liberal Democrats, two Conservatives and two independents.

The town falls within the non-metropolitan district of South Somerset, which was formed on 1 April 1974 under the Local Government Act 1972, having previously been Crewkerne Urban District. The district council is responsible for local planning and building control, local roads, council housing, environmental health, markets and fairs, refuse collection and recycling, cemeteries and crematoria, leisure services, parks, and tourism. This electoral ward includes Misterton and at the 2011 Census had a population of 7,826.

Crewkerne Town Hall occupies part of the Victoria Hall in the Market Square. The Hamstone building was rebuilt around 1742, altered in 1836, when a south piazza was added after the demolition of the shambles. In 1848-9 it became a museum, reading room and library and was remodelled in 1900 by Thomas Benson of Yeovil to create shops and offices. It is a Grade II listed building.

Somerset County Council is responsible for running the largest and most expensive local services such as education, social services, the library, roads, public transport, trading standards, waste disposal and strategic planning, although fire, police and ambulance services are provided jointly with other authorities through the Devon and Somerset Fire and Rescue Service, Avon and Somerset Constabulary and the South Western Ambulance Service.

It is served by the Yeovil seat in the House of Commons of the Parliament of the United Kingdom. It elects one Member of Parliament (MP) by the first past the post system of election. Before Brexit in 2020 it was part of the South West England constituency of the European Parliament from that area's 1979 inception.

Geography

The town lies west of the River Parrett. The main residential areas are around the town centre with Kithill and Park View to the South and Wadham Park to the North.

In the northern outskirts of the town is the Bincombe Beeches  Local Nature Reserve. which is managed by the town council and includes a line of beech trees, some of which are between 150 and 200 years old. Between 2002 and 2005 grants were obtained to improve access to the site and support the planting of new trees. The Millwater biological Site of Special Scientific Interest consists of a complex mosaic of pasture, wet grassland, tall-herb fen, standing and running water, alder and willow carr.

Climate

Along with the rest of South West England, Crewkerne has a temperate climate which is generally wetter and milder than the rest of the country. Seasonal temperature variation is less extreme than most of the nation due to nearby shore/land breezes to/from seas. In the summer the Azores high pressure normally extends to the Region, yet convective cloud will on some days form inland, cutting sunshine. Annual sunshine rates are slightly less than the regional average of 1,600 hours. Most of the rainfall in the south-west is caused by Atlantic depressions or by convection. Most of the rainfall in autumn and winter is caused by the Atlantic depressions, which is when they are most active. In summer, a large proportion of the rainfall is caused by sun heating the ground leading to convection and to showers and thunderstorms. About 8–15 days of snowfall is typical. November to March have the highest mean wind speeds, and June to August have the lightest winds. The predominant wind direction is from the south-west.

Transport
The following roads pass through Crewkerne:
Northbound: A356 North Street — To A303 for London and North Somerset.
Southbound: A356 South Street- To Maiden Newton and Dorchester.
Westbound: A30 West Street — To Exeter and the South West of England.
Eastbound :A30 East Street — To Yeovil and Salisbury.
Southbound: B3165 Hermitage Street — To Lyme Regis.
The closest motorway is the M5 at junction 25 for Taunton.

Crewkerne railway station, in nearby Misterton, is served by South Western Railway on what was the main south western railway line before it was outranked by the Taunton line. There is also a service provided by Great Western Railway to London Paddington. The station was opened by the London and South Western Railway on 19 July 1860. It was designed by Sir William Tite and has been designated as a Grade II listed building.

The town is served by Stagecoach South West with buses to Yeovil via Kithill, Misterton and Haselbury Plucknett and Chard. Buses also run to Merriott, South Petherton and Ilminster and Taunton. First West of England has service to Bridport via Beaminster and Broadwindsor, Yeovil via East Chinnock and West Coker and Chard.

Economy

Crewkerne is a small market town centre with many cafes, shops and supermarkets. Crewkerne also has a wide selection of public houses. All of the large supermarkets are situated around the South Street multi-storey car park. The other smaller supermarket is Lidl.

Ariel Motor Company is based in Crewkerne, and is one of the UK's smallest automobile companies, with just seven employees, producing fewer than 100 cars per year. It was founded in 1991 and changed its name from Solocrest Ltd in 2001. The company's flagship car is the Ariel Atom, an extremely light, high performance car.

Religious sites

St Bartholomew's Parish Church stands on high ground to the west of the town. The first Saxon church was founded before the end of the 9th century as a "minster", or main church of a Saxon royal estate that included an area which later became the parishes of Seaborough, Wayford and Misterton. This church was replaced after the Norman Conquest with a larger stone cruciform building, with a central tower. This was almost completely rebuilt and enlarged in the late 15th and early 16th centuries. This is, for the most part, the church building visible today. It is an excellent example of the Perpendicular style with many unusual and individual features. These include the west front, the nave, the six-light aisle windows and the Tudor-style chapels and windows in the north east corner. The building material is golden-coloured Ham Hill stone, quarried nearby. There is a notable pair of 'green man' carvings within the church.

No major alterations have been made since the Reformation in the 1530s and 1540s, but there have been many changes to the interior to accommodate various phases of Church of England worship. Among these are an oven used for baking communion bread in the south east corner of the north chapel. During the Civil War, considerable damage was done including the destruction of nearly all of the medieval stained glass. William III of England worshipped in the church following his landing in the Glorious Revolution of 1689. By the early 19th century, all the medieval furnishings, except the Norman font had disappeared. New pews were made and the west galleries were added in 1808–11. The latest restoration that has left the church interior visible today, took place in the late 19th century; it was more sympathetic to the church's architectural character than many Victorian restorations. At this time, the central section of the west gallery was removed to reveal the great west window and the organ was relocated to the south transept. The pews date from around 1900 and have attractive carved bench-ends. The church has been designated by English Heritage as a Grade I listed building.

Crewkerne also contains one of very few Unitarian chapels left in the West Country, Crewkerne Unitarian Church, a tiny chapel tucked away on Hermitage Street. The Methodist church on South Street is shared by Roman Catholic and Methodist congregations, following the closure and proposed redevelopment of St Peter's Catholic Church. Christ Church, a chapel of ease to St Bartholomew's, was built on South Street in 1852–54. It was declared redundant in 1969 and demolished in 1975. It is now the site of the residential Christchurch Court.

Education

The primary schools in Crewkerne are St. Bartholomew's on Kithill, and Ashlands on North Street. The middle school is Maiden Beech Academy on the B3165 Lyme Road. The school has students from ages 9 to 13, seeing Key Stage 2 SATS.

Crewkerne Grammar School was at DeCombe House, until it closed in the late 1960s, to combine into St Martin's School long on Abbey Street (having moved from the high street in the late 1970s). Its Senior and Juniors School closed in 2003, leaving a pre-school nursery. Its gym was on Gouldsbrook Terrace, converted since.

Wadham School has students from 13 to 18 years old and includes those travelling from surrounding villages. In November 2005, Wadham was placed into Special measures after failing an Ofsted inspection. In June 2007 the school successfully left these, after a full Ofsted inspection showed ample progress.

Culture
The Henhayes Centre provides conference facilities and has also featured exhibitions.

Crewkerne and District Museum is part of a wider heritage centre which includes local archives and a meeting room. The museum opened in 2000 in an old house with an 18th-century frontage. It was restored with the help of grants from the Heritage Lottery Fund, Somerset County Council, South Somerset District Council and Crewkerne Town Council. The development of Crewkerne during the 18th and 19th centuries, with particular emphasis on the flax and linen industry is illustrated with a permanent display. Other collections relate to local archaeology, Coins and Medals, Costume and Textiles, Fine Art, Music, Personalities, Science and Technology, Social History, Weapons and War.

Sport
The Crewkerne Aqua Centre also provides swimming pool and fitness gym facilities to the town, located on the grounds next to Henhayes Park, which used to be the Grammar Schools Playing fields. St. Martins School retained the use of the playing fields until the junior section was closed in 2003, as regular sports days were a tradition dating back to the Grammar school era in the town. A further sports centre is situated on the Wadham School campus. Crewkerne Cricket Club play in the Somerset Cricket League whilst Crewkerne Rangers F.C. play in the Perry Street and District League. With Crewkerne ladies football club playing in the Somerset Women's County league.  There are also 2 Lawn Bowls clubs in the town.

Notable residents
Thomas Coryat a traveller and writer of the late Elizabethan and early Jacobean age was born in Crewkerne around 1577. Mathematician John Caswell was also born here. A later traveller Colonel Joshua Fry was born in the town in 1699 before becoming a surveyor, adventurer, mapmaker, soldier, and member of the House of Burgesses, the legislature of the colony of Virginia. Another Englishman from Crewkerne who emigrated to the American Colonies was William Phelps who was born around 1599 and became one of the founders of both Dorchester, Massachusetts and Windsor, Connecticut, foreman of the first grand jury in New England, served most of his life in early colonial government, and played a key role in establishing the first democratic town government in the American colonies. Ralph Reader an actor, theatrical producer and songwriter, best known for staging the original Gang Show, a Variety show for members of the Scouting Movement, was born in Crewkerne in 1903. The cricketer Michael Barnwell was born in the town in 1943.

Twin towns
Crewkerne is twinned with Igny, Essonne and Bures-sur-Yvette in France.

References

External links

Town Council

 
Towns in South Somerset
Market towns in Somerset
Civil parishes in Somerset